This page provides supplementary chemical data on 1-Propanol (n-propanol).

Material Safety Data Sheet  

The handling of this chemical may incur notable safety precautions. It is highly recommended that you seek the Material Safety Datasheet (MSDS) for this chemical from a reliable source.

Structure and properties

Thermodynamic properties

Vapor pressure of liquid

Table data obtained from CRC Handbook of Chemistry and Physics 44th ed.

Distillation data

Spectral data

References

 

Chemical data pages
Chemical data pages cleanup